South Lebanon may refer to:

 1978 South Lebanon conflict
 South Governorate, one of the governorates of Lebanon
 South Lebanon Army, of the country Lebanon
 South Lebanon conflict (1982–2000)
 South Lebanon conflict (disambiguation)
 South Lebanon Township, Pennsylvania, part of the Lebanon, Pennsylvania, metropolitan area
 South Lebanon, Ohio, a village in the United States
 South Lebanon, Oregon, a census-designated place in the United States
 Southern Lebanon, the geographical area of Lebanon